Jennifer Gunter is a Canadian-American gynecologist, a New York Times columnist covering women's health, an author, and a specialist in chronic pain medicine and vulvovaginal disorders.

Early life and education
Gunter was born in Winnipeg, Canada.

A positive experience at the hospital when she was eleven and had a skateboard accident motivated her to decide on a career in health care: declining sedation, she watched the hospital staff perform an angiogram on her ruptured spleen as they explained the procedure to her.

From 1984 to 1986, Gunter studied at the University of Winnipeg until being accepted into medical school in 1986. In 1990, Gunter graduated from the University of Manitoba College of Medicine. From 1990 to 1995, she completed obstetrics and gynecology training at the University of Western Ontario in London, Ontario. In 1995, Gunter moved to the United States for a fellowship in infectious diseases and women's health at the University of Kansas Medical Center where she also developed an interest in the area of pain management.

Career

Doctor
From 1996 to 2001, Gunter worked at the University of Kansas Medical Center for an additional five years after the one year fellowship ended.

In 2001, Gunter worked as a lecturer at the University of Colorado Hospital in Denver, Colorado. During this time the loss of one of Gunter's sons in a triplet pregnancy she described as traumatic made her decide to shift her work away from the field of obstetrics. Instead she focused on gynecology, specializing in vaginal and vulval conditions.

Gunter has practiced medicine since 1996. Gunter works as an OB/GYN and a pain medicine physician. Her approach is based on evidence-based medicine integrated with a focus on empathy and the patient experience, which Gunter said she learned from the University of Western Ontario, and the adjacency to McMaster University Medical School, which is a center of evidence-based medicine.

Since 2006, she has been at The Permanente Medical Group of Kaiser Permanente in Northern California. At Kaiser, Gunter manages a health clinic for women in the Chronic Pelvic Pain & Vulvo-Vaginal Disorders division.

Author
Around 2004 Gunter delivered triplets prematurely: one was born at just 22 weeks and did not survive and the other two were born at 26 weeks. The lack of publicly available, medically sound information about the particular needs of premature babies motivated her to write a book entitled, The Preemie Primer: A Complete Guide for Parents of Premature Babies — from Birth through the Toddler Years and Beyond.

Since 2011 Gunter has written a blog that has reached 15 million views and has generated controversies in the mainstream media. Gunter has been critical of dubious health claims made by celebrities and the careless way that media outlets report on matters such as reproductive health and vaccination. She advocates for more responsible health coverage by the news media, less weight given to health advice by celebrities and for doctors to communicate better with their patients.

In June 2019, The Lancet published an opinion piece by Gunter calling for "a better medical internet" by having more medical experts involved in disseminating adequate medical information to the public. "It is simply not acceptable to me that quality research that can save lives and reduce suffering could be undone by a medical conspiracy theorist or a celebrity looking to sell supplements."

Gunter writes two regular columns on women's health at The New York Times: a monthly column called "The Cycle" and a weekly column called "You Asked".

Gunter is known by the nickname "Twitter's Resident Gynecologist", and has used Twitter to share information about pain management and to debunk myths about women's health. As of 2019, her Twitter account reaches over 200,000 followers.

Her book The Menopause Manifesto debuted at number 4 on The New York Times best seller list for "Advice, How-To & Miscellaneous" on June 6, 2021.

The Vagina Bible
In 2019 Gunter's second book, The Vagina Bible, was published. The book presents medical information about female reproductive anatomy and corrects common myths. Writing the book is a reaction to what she sees as a large amount of dangerous false information on the web about female health. The book includes a section focusing on trans men and women. The title reached No. 1 on the list of Canadian nonfiction bestsellers, according to the Retail Council of Canada.

During promotion of the book there was controversy when the publisher's Twitter advertisements were blocked for use of inappropriate language (presumably the word vagina). The ads were only allowed to run after a large online conversation developed.
In a 2019 review, doctor Harriet Hall states that "Dr. Jen Gunter has done women everywhere a great service by writing" this book. Hall calls Gunter the perfect person to write this with her years in medicine and gynecology as well as being a "gifted communicator". Hall calls The Vagina Bible a "owner's manual for the vagina ... I wish every girl and woman everywhere had a copy of this book."

Popular culture
As a doctor, Gunter has spoken out on a variety of topics affecting women's health, including abortion, the HPV vaccine, and the use of fetal tissue in research. Gunter corrects misconceptions about women's health through her books, newspaper column and online discussions. Since May 2021, Gunter hosts a TED Audio Collective podcast called Body Stuff with Dr. Jen Gunter, which aims to combat common health myths.

In 2015, Gunter's blog post critical over an article in the Toronto Star which mischaracterized the safety of Gardasil, a HPV vaccine, resulted in an apology by Toronto Star. There was additional discussion and scrutiny over the coverage of vaccine safety in the mainstream press.

Goop
Gunter is a long-time critic of products sold by Goop, the company owned by actress Gwyneth Paltrow.

Her criticism of one of Goop's products, a jade egg meant to be inserted in one's vagina, came to the attention of a wider audience when her blog post of January 17, 2017, was picked up by a tabloid newspaper. Additional posts elicited a written response from Goop directly responding to Gunter's criticism. Goop also eventually paid consumer protection fines and refunded the cost of vaginal eggs to customers who purchased them.

This exchange provoked an intervention by Timothy Caulfield, a Canada research chair in health law and policy at the University of Alberta, who supported Gunter's position. Caulfield stated that, "studies have consistently found, for example, that celebrities can have a measurable and less-than-ideal impact on everything from cancer screening to smoking to the food that we eat."
 
In October 2018, Gunter and archaeologist Sarah Parcak published a study to investigate whether or not jade eggs were used vaginally in ancient China, as Goop's marketing claims they were. A review of the description of 5,000 artifacts available in major databases of Chinese archeology found no mention of such an object.

Jensplaining
In June 2019, the Canadian Broadcasting Corporation announced the 10-part docuseries called Jensplaining  which aired on their free streaming network called CBC Gem in August 2019. The series comprised ten episodes, with topics including menstruation, wellness, vaccines, menopause, weight loss, birth and sex.

Vagisil
In February 2021, Vagisil released a new line of products called OMV!, aimed at teenagers, which include scented wipes, cleansers and anti itch creams for vaginas and vulvas. Gunter expressed her discontent with the company's advertising suggesting that something needed to be fixed with teens' vaginas. She states that vulvas and vaginas take care of themselves and explains that even wipes can be irritating and cause inflammation. Vagisil has responded to criticism of their new line by stating that their products are safe for external use and have been tested by independent dermatologists and gynecologists.

Personal life
Gunter has been married twice. Gunter is divorced from her second husband. Gunter and her twin sons have lived in Northern California since 2005.  The third son of what would have been triplets died moments after birth at 22 weeks gestation.

Gunter has spoken about her struggles with a lifelong binge eating disorder and said she has considered writing a book about weight loss.

Certifications
 American Board of Pain Medicine, Pain Medicine, Diplomate (DABPM)
 American Board of Physical Medicine and Rehab, Pain Medicine (ABPMR (pain))
 American Congress of Obstetricians and Gynecologists, Obstetrics and Gynecology, Fellow (FACOG)
 Royal College of Physicians and Surgeons of Canada, Fellow (FRCS(C))

Selected works and publications

Books

Selected articles

Selected journals

References

External links

 
 Dr. Jen Gunter – Blog
 
 The Cycle monthly column at The New York Times
Body Stuff with Dr. Jen Gunter Podcast 

1966 births
American obstetricians
American gynecologists
Critics of alternative medicine
Living people
University of Manitoba alumni
University of Western Ontario alumni
Science communicators
Women gynaecologists
21st-century Canadian physicians
21st-century Canadian women scientists
Canadian gynaecologists
Canadian obstetricians